RCPI may refer to:

Received Channel Power Indicator
Revolutionary Communist Party of India
Royal College of Physicians of Ireland